Knesebeck is a village in Gifhorn (district) (Lower-Saxony). It is home to an important industry (Butting Gruppe GmbH & Co. KG) in the region.

Associations and Cultural Life
For events of the various local clubs, see the calendar of events.

Music Clubs
Spielmannszug Jägercorps Knesebeck
Spielmannszug Schwarzes Corps Knesebeck
Musikzug der Freiwilligen Feuerwehr Knesebeck
Knesebecker Bläserkreis

Sports Clubs
VFL Knesebeck
Lauftreff Isenhagener Land

Activities
Freiwillige Feuerwehr Knesebeck
Riding club

Economy

Industry
 Butting Gruppe GmbH & Co. KG
Consulting
 Steuerkanzlei Wolter
Media
 Druckerei Kirchhoff
Craft
 Bau- und Möbeltischlerei Holler GmbH
Schools and conferencing facilities
 Knesebeck primary school
 Butting Academy
 Private music school

Health Care
 Dr. Supady, general practitioner
 Dr. Dettmer, general practitioner
 Erik Lühe, dentist
 Einhorn-Apotheke Knesebeck, pharmacy

Traffic and Infrastructure
Knesebeck is connected to the Deutsche Bahn railway network. Connections are slow, but they provide good access to the German high-speed railway network via Wolfsburg, Braunschweig and Uelzen. The Wolfsburg high-speed connections allow an easy access to the airports in Hannover, Berlin and Frankfurt. Volkswagen operates regular business flights from the Braunschweig/Wolfsburg airport.

Tourism and Spare Time
There are possible opportunities in Knesebeck for jogging, hunting and horse-riding. Sport facilities are provided by the Knesebeck sports associations. There is a public outdoor swimming area which is a natural lake, a small indoor pool and sauna.

Attractions in the region are the Lüneburger Heide, the Otterzentrum in Hankensbüttel, the Phaeno and Autostadt in Wolfsburg, the historic old towns of Celle, Lüneburg und Salzwedel as well as the Museumsdorf Hösseringen.

Personalities
 Ernst von Lenthe, (* 23. November 1823 in Knesebeck, † 7. February 1888 in Hannover): Oberappellationsgerichtsrat, deputy
 Bernd Fix (* 19. March 1962): Hacker (Chaos Computer Club)
 Lars Nieberg (* 24. Juli 1963): Winner in the Olympic Games, Equestrian / Jumping

References

External links
 Knesebeck local news website
 The family "von dem Knesebeck"

Villages in Lower Saxony
Wittingen